The North American Academy of the Spanish Language is an institution made up of philologists of the Spanish language who live and work in the United States, including writers, poets, professors, educators and experts in the language itself. Its mission is to support and promote the study and correct usage of Spanish in the United States of America (not including Puerto Rico where it has their own academy). The Academia, established in New York City in 1973, is a corresponding member of the Real Academia Española (Royal Spanish Academy) and a member of the Asociación de Academias de la Lengua Española (Association of Academies of the Spanish Language), in Madrid, Spain.

Directors of the Academy:
 Carlos McHale (1973–1978)
 Odón Betanzos Palacios (1978–2007)
 Gerardo Piña-Rosales (2008–present)

Members
 Luis López Álvarez
 Luis Alberto Ambroggio
 Joaquin Badajoz
 Tina Escaja
 Isaac Goldemberg
 Robert Lima
 José Ferrater Mora (1912–1991)
 Orlando Rossardi
 Priscilla Gac-Artigas
Porfirio Rodríguez

References

External links 

  
  

Spanish language academies
Spanish language in the United States
Organizations based in New York City
Organizations established in 1973
1973 establishments in New York City